Oleg Ivaninsky (born June 5, 1966, Novosibirsk, Novosibirsk Oblast) is a Russian political figure and a deputy of the  8th State Duma.

In 1995 he was awarded a Doctor of Sciences in Medical Sciences degree. At the beginning of the 1990s, Ivaninsky worked as a urologist at the state Novosibirsk regional clinical hospital. In 1996–1998, he headed the health department of the administration of the Central District of Novosibirsk. From 2001 to 2021, he was a deputy of the Legislative Assembly of Novosibirsk Oblast of the 3rd, 4th, 5th, and, later, 7th convocations. From 2001 to 2011, Oleg Ivaninsky worked as the chief physician of the municipal health care service "Emergency Medical Aid Station" in Novosibirsk. In 2011, he headed the Novosibirsk Regional Clinical Oncological Dispensary. In 2014, Ivaninsky was appointed the Minister of Health of the Novosibirsk Oblast. Since September 2021, he has served as a deputy of the 8th State Duma.

Oleg Ivaninsky is married and has three children.

References

1966 births
Living people
United Russia politicians
21st-century Russian politicians
Eighth convocation members of the State Duma (Russian Federation)